The Falcon Takes Over (also known as The Falcon Steps Out), is a 1942 black-and-white mystery film directed by Irving Reis. The B film was the third, following The Gay Falcon and A Date with the Falcon (1941), to star George Sanders as the character Gay Lawrence, a gentleman detective known by the sobriquet the Falcon.

Plot
Brutish prison escapee Moose Malloy (Ward Bond) forces "Goldie" Locke (Allen Jenkins) to drive him to Club 13, a posh nightclub, where Moose hopes to be reunited with his old girlfriend Velma. After bashing his way into the club and not finding Velma, he kills the club manager and forces Goldie to drive him away from the club. When Gay Lawrence (George Sanders), an amateur sleuth and Goldie's boss, arrives at the club, he learns that Moose is the suspect, because the manager died of a broken neck. Police Inspector Mike O'Hara (James Gleason) arrests Goldie as an accomplice, but after being questioned, Goldie is released.

Lawrence and Goldie head out to the house in Brooklyn where Moose is hiding. Pretending to be drunk, Lawrence enters the house while Moose makes a getaway in Goldie's car. In the house, Jessie Florian (Anne Revere) is on the telephone, shouting hysterically and demanding protection from Moose. Jessie is told to send Moose to a certain address. Jessie tells Lawrence that Velma is dead. Seeing the address, he knows where Moose will be.

When Lawrence returns to his apartment, a call from Quincy W. Marriot (Hans Conried) to deliver ransom money for a stolen jade necklace, sends Lawrence to a deserted graveyard. Marriot ambushes him, grabs the detective's gun, and shoots him, but, in turn, is shot by an unseen assailant who makes his escape.

Seeing Lawrence is still alive, Reporter Ann Reardon (Lynn Bari), who has been trailing him, helps the detective to his feet, learning his gun was loaded with blanks. Lawrence searches Marriott's coat pockets and finds a business card from psychic Jules Amthor (Turhan Bey), at 415 Morton Avenue, the address where Moose is going.

Lawrence asks Ann to track down the stolen necklace that belongs to socialite Diana Kenyon (Helen Gilbert). He makes a date to meet Diana at the Swan Club later that night, while Goldie heads to see Amthor. When he enters the house, Goldie sees Moose arrive, but the lights go out and gunfire erupts. When the lights are back on, O'Hara enters and discovers Amthor's dead body. Lawrence and Goldie return to Jessies's house, to find her dead, with a broken neck.

Working on clues left at Jessie's house, Lawrence is convinced something is wrong with the theory that Moose is a murderer. Returning to his apartment, he meets Ann, who, after spending the day at police headquarters, learns the police think that Moose pleaded guilty to manslaughter to protect Laird Burnett (Selmer Jackson), the owner of the Swan Club. Diana goes on a drive with Lawrence who has already guessed her true identity, as Velma. When she tries to kill Lawrence, Moose, who had been driving, turns on her, but is shot and killed. Ann arrives in a backfiring car that gives Lawrence a chance to disarm Velma.

Ann gets her first big scoop, uncovering a sordid blackmail scheme that involved Velma, Burnett and Marriott. Just when Lawrence is about to leave the squad room to meet his fiancée, a glamorous woman asks for his help and he comes to her aid.

Cast

 George Sanders as Gay Lawrence aka The Falcon
 Lynn Bari as Ann Reardon
 James Gleason as Police Inspector Mike O'Hara, head of the homicide squad
 Allen Jenkins as Jonathan "Goldie" Locke
 Warren Jackson as Montgomery, Club manager
 Helen Gilbert as Diana Kenyon, known as "Velma"
 Ward Bond as Moose Malloy, an escaped convict
 Edward Gargan as Bates
 Anne Revere as Jessie Florian
 George Cleveland as Jerry
 Harry Shannon as Grimes
 Hans Conried as Quincy W. Marriot
 Turhan Bey as Jules Amthor
 Charlie Hall as Swan Club Waiter Louie
 Mickey Simpson as Bartender
 Selmer Jackson as Laird Burnett (uncredited)

Production
Although the film featured the Falcon and other characters created by Michael Arlen, its plot was taken from the Raymond Chandler novel Farewell, My Lovely, with the Falcon substituted for Chandler's archetypal private eye Philip Marlowe and the setting of New York City replacing Marlowe's Los Angeles beat. The film was the second adaptation of a Marlowe story, after Time to Kill, released earlier in the same year.  That film, also, did not use Marlowe as the main character, changing the name to Michael Shayne.

Reception
The Falcon Takes Over was considered a "co-feature" or the second half of a double bill. Theodore Strauss in his review for The New York Times, wrote, "For a man of Mr. Sanders's cool talents, "The Falcon Takes Over" is a distinct waste of time."

Later, similar reviews were received. Critic Louis Black, in a 1999 article for The Austin Chronicle, wrote that the film "... had none of the atmosphere of Chandler's book" and recommended instead, the later adaptation, Murder, My Sweet (1944).

Film reviewer Bruce Newman, wrote in San Jose Mercury News, "The studios had so little interest in the character that in the first two movie adaptations of Chandler's books, he was replaced. When RKO bought the screen rights to Farewell, My Lovely, the studio made a craven bid to cash in on the popularity of the Warner Bros. hit, The Maltese Falcon, turning Marlowe into a detective called the Falcon (played by George Sanders) and releasing the movie with the title, The Falcon Takes Over".

References

Notes

Bibliography

 Jewell, Richard and Vernon Harbin. The RKO Story. New Rochelle, New York: Arlington House, 1982. .

External links
 
 
 
 

1942 films
1940s mystery thriller films
1940s crime thriller films
American crime thriller films
American mystery thriller films
American black-and-white films
American detective films
Films based on American novels
Films set in New York City
RKO Pictures films
Films directed by Irving Reis
Films based on works by Raymond Chandler
The Falcon (film character) films
1940s English-language films
1940s American films